The 2010 Challenger Ciudad de Guayaquil was a professional tennis tournament played on outdoor red clay courts. It was the sixth edition of the tournament which is part of the 2010 ATP Challenger Tour. It took place in Guayaquil, Ecuador between 8 and 14 November 2010.

Singles main draw entrants

Seeds

 Rankings are as of November 1, 2010.

Other entrants
The following players received wildcards into the singles main draw:
  Júlio César Campozano
  Emilio Gómez
  Eric Nunez
  Roberto Quiroz

The following players received entry from the qualifying draw:
  Andrea Arnaboldi
  Benjamin Balleret
  Gianluca Naso
  Martín Vassallo Argüello

Champions

Singles

 Paul Capdeville def.  Diego Junqueira, 6–3, 3–6, 6–3

Doubles

 Juan Sebastián Cabal /  Robert Farah def.  Franco Ferreiro /  André Sá, 7–5, 7–6(3)

External links
Official Website
ITF Search 
ATP official site

Challenger Ciudad de Guayaquil
Clay court tennis tournaments
Tennis tournaments in Ecuador
Challenger Ciudad de Guayaquil